The IS/MP model (Investment–Savings / Monetary–Policy) is a macroeconomic tool which displays short-run fluctuations in the interest rate, inflation and output.

Formation

MP curve
The MP curve displays a positive relationship, upward-sloping curve, where the real interest rate is located on the vertical axis and inflation rate on the horizontal axis.

Shifts on the MP curve are produced by actions of the  Federal Reserve.  So, a target decrease in the federal funds rate, shifts the MP curve to the right, which results in a decrease in the real interest rate and an increase in the inflation rate.

IS curve

The IS curve displays a negative relationship between the real interest rate, located on the vertical axis, and total output, on the horizontal axis.

Shifts on the IS curve are produced by the actions of the government and consumers. For example, an increase in either consumer or government spending shifts the IS curve rightwards, resulting in an increase in total output for any level of the interest rate.

Analysis
Example: A lowering of the federal funds target would shift the MP curve to the right, resulting in a lower interest rate, and higher inflation.  This lower interest rate results in a downward movement along the IS curve, increasing output.

Incorporation into larger models
The IS/MP model is used as a foundation for the AD–AS model. When used within the AD–AS framework we may derive long-term movements in inflation and interest rates, rather than base, short-run movements.

Criticism
Greg Mankiw maintains the IS/MP model has "quirky features". Mankiw prefers the IS–LM model, for, according to him, it focuses on "important connections between the money supply, interest rates, and economic activity, whereas the IS/MP model leaves some of that in the background".

References

Monetary economics
Economics curves